The Squash Federation of Africa (SFA) was set up in 1992 regulates squash throughout Africa and the Indian Ocean islands.

It is based in Johannesburg, Gauteng in South Africa. As of 2012 it has 19 member federations.

List of members

External links
 Squash Federation of Africa official website

See also
 All-Africa Games

References

1992 establishments in South Africa
Squash organizations
Squash in Africa
Sports governing bodies in Africa
World Squash Federation